Lenodora vittata is a moth of the family Lasiocampidae first described by Francis Walker in 1855. It is found in India and Sri Lanka.

Biology
The caterpillar is a pest of rice. Brachymeria species are known parasitoids of the moth.

References

Further reading
 Botanical pesticides – a major alternative to chemical pesticides: A review

Moths of Asia
Moths described in 1855